The National Football League playoffs for the 2017 season began with the Wild Card Round on January 6, 2018, and concluded with Super Bowl LII on February 4, 2018, when the Philadelphia Eagles defeated the New England Patriots at U.S. Bank Stadium in Minneapolis, Minnesota.

Several teams broke long playoff droughts, as the Buffalo Bills, Los Angeles Rams, Jacksonville Jaguars and Tennessee Titans each qualified for the playoffs for the first time since 1999, 2004, 2007 and 2008, respectively.

This was the first postseason since 2008–09 to not feature Aaron Rodgers and the Green Bay Packers and the first since 2001-02 without the Manning name (Peyton or Eli).

The playoffs were also notable for the Patriots reaching a seventh consecutive AFC Championship Game, extending their own NFL record, and the Eagles snapping a 57-year championship drought and claiming their first in the Super Bowl era.

For the first time since 2013–14, no games went to overtime.

As of 2023, this represents the most recent postseason where the AFC Championship game does not take place at Arrowhead.

Participants

Bracket

Schedule
Source:

Wild card playoffs

Saturday, January 6, 2018

AFC: Tennessee Titans 22, Kansas City Chiefs 21

The Tennessee Titans overcame an 18-point halftime deficit to defeat the Kansas City Chiefs 22–21 and won their first playoff game since the 2003 season.

Kansas City opened the scoring on their second possession of the game. After Alex Smith connected with Tyreek Hill for 45 yards and Travis Kelce for a 27-yard completion, Kareem Hunt ran in for a one-yard touchdown. On their next drive the Chiefs drove 76 yards in five plays, with Smith completing a 26-yard pass to Hill and an 18-yard pass to receiver Albert Wilson. Following an 18-yard run by Hunt, Smith hit Kelce for a 13-yard touchdown. Smith finished the quarter with 154 passing yards, a career high.

In the second quarter, Tennessee advanced to Kansas City's 21-yard line before Marcus Mariota was intercepted by Marcus Peters, who returned the ball 28 yards to the Chiefs' 37-yard line. Following a punt, tight end Delanie Walker's 22-yard reception sparked a drive to the Chiefs' 22-yard line; however, on third-and-4, linebacker Derrick Johnson sacked Mariota and forced the team to settle for a 49-yard Ryan Succop field goal. The Chiefs increased their lead to 18 points by the end of the half, however, with a nine-play, 79-yard drive that culminated in a 14-yard scoring pass from Smith to Demarcus Robinson with three seconds left in the half. Kansas City went into halftime with a 21–3 lead, with more total yards (284 to 127) and more first downs (16 to 3). However, Kelce suffered a game-ending injury while catching a 12-yard pass on the final drive.

Tennessee opened the second half with a 15-play, 91-yard drive that consumed 8:29 off the clock. On a third-down play from the Kansas City 6-yard line, Mariota attempted a pass, which was deflected by Darrelle Revis, back to Mariota, who ran it in for a touchdown, making him the first quarterback to complete a touchdown pass to himself in a postseason game. The Chiefs were forced to punt on their next drive, but Adoree' Jackson muffed the catch and Keith Reaser recovered for Kansas City. They were unable to capitalize on the turnover, however, as they lost two yards over their next three plays and Harrison Butker hit the upright from a 48-yard field goal attempt. Tennessee took the ball back and drove 62 yards in six plays, scoring on a 35-yard run by Derrick Henry on the second play of the fourth quarter to cut the score to 21–16 after a failed two-point conversion.

Again forcing a Kansas City punt, Tennessee drove 81 yards in 11 plays to take their first lead of the game. Mariota converted three third downs on the drive, completing a 9-yard pass to Walker on third-and-3, scrambling 17 yards for a first down on third-and-8, and then connecting a 10-yard pass to tight end Jonnu Smith on third-and-2. Eventually, Mariota finished the drive by throwing to Eric Decker for a 22-yard touchdown, giving Tennessee a 22–21 lead following another failed two-point conversion with 6:06 remaining. Kansas City then drove into Tennessee territory, but Alex Smith was sacked on third down by Derrick Morgan and then missed a pass to Wilson on fourth down with 2:09 left. On the second play of Tennessee's drive, Johnson recovered a Henry fumble and returned it 56 yards for a touchdown, but Henry was ruled down by contact upon review. One play later, Kansas City had one last chance to get the ball back on a third-and-10 situation. Mariota handed the ball off to Henry, who started to run to the middle, but then switched direction and ran to the left. Aided by a key block from Mariota against linebacker Frank Zombo, Henry raced 22 yards down the left sideline for a game-clinching first down, and the Titans ran out the rest of the clock, having held the Chiefs to 41 yards and three first downs in the second half.

Alex Smith finished as the leading passer with 264 yards and two touchdowns, but only 110 yards after the first quarter. Mariota threw for 205 yards, two touchdowns and an interception in his first playoff start; his self-caught touchdown pass made him the first player since at least 1950 to throw and catch a touchdown pass in the same playoff game. Henry gained 156 yards on 23 carries and 191 total yards from scrimmage, while Hunt, the league's leading rusher during the regular season, gained just 42 yards on 11 carries. Chiefs coach Andy Reid faced criticism for not relying on Hunt to protect their lead in the second half, as Hunt only carried the ball five times after halftime.

Tennessee became the first road team to erase an 18-point deficit to win a postseason game since the 1972 playoffs. The loss was Kansas City's sixth consecutive home playoff loss, extending a league record.

NFC: Atlanta Falcons 26, Los Angeles Rams 13

In the first playoff game at the Los Angeles Memorial Coliseum since the 1993 NFL season, and the first Rams playoff hosted at the venue since the 1978 NFL season, Matt Ryan threw for 218 yards and a touchdown, and kicker Matt Bryant kicked four field goals to beat the Rams.

Atlanta got an early scoring opportunity when Blake Countess muffed a punt that Falcons linebacker LaRoy Reynolds recovered on the Rams' 17-yard line, leading to Matt Bryant's 29-yard field goal. Then, after a punt, Atlanta receiver Julio Jones caught a 27-yard pass and rushed for 13 yards on an end-around play as the team drove 57 yards in nine plays to go up 6–0 on Bryant's 51-yard field goal. Damontae Kazee forced a fumble from Pharoh Cooper on the ensuing kickoff, which Kemal Ishmael recovered for Atlanta on the Rams' 32-yard line. This time, the Falcons were able to take the ball to the end zone, scoring on a 3-yard touchdown run by Devonta Freeman as a result of center Alex Mack literally dragging him across the goal line.

Late in the second quarter, the Rams finally managed to get on the board, sparked by a 26-yard run by Todd Gurley. Jared Goff finished the drive with passes to Cooper Kupp, the first for 15 yards and the second a 14-yard touchdown completion that made the score 13–7. The next time they had the ball, only 1:15 remained in the half, but they were able to convert a 38-yard completion from Goff to Robert Woods into a 35-yard Sam Ficken field goal, making the score 13–10 at halftime.

The Falcons took up more than half the third quarter with their opening drive, moving the ball 76 yards in 16 plays. Freeman carried the ball six times for 42 yards, while quarterback Matt Ryan converted a fourth-and-1 with a 1-yard sneak. Bryant finished the possession with his third field goal, this one from 25 yards, increasing their lead to 16–10. After a Rams punt, Ryan's completions to Jones for gains of 12 and 16 yards set up Bryant's fourth field goal, a 51-yard kick, to put the team up 19–10. The Rams quickly struck back, with Gurley rushing twice for gains of 14 and 33 yards, along with Goff completing an 18-yard pass to Woods. Ficken's 32-yard field goal at the end of the drive cut the deficit to 19–13 with just over 10 minutes left. However, Atlanta came back with an eight-play, 83-yard drive featuring a 52-yard completion from Ryan to Mohamed Sanu. On the last play, Ryan's 8-yard touchdown pass to Jones put his team up 26–13. The Rams responded with one last drive to try and get back in the game, moving the ball to a third-and-goal situation on Atlanta's 5-yard line. Goff then threw a touchdown pass to tight end Tyler Higbee, but the call was reversed by a review, as replays showed the ball hit the ground as Higbee was going to the turf. On the next play, Goff threw an incomplete pass, causing a turnover on downs with 2:05 left. The Rams received the ball one more time, but this resulted in another turnover on downs.	

Ryan completed 21 of 30 passes for 213 yards and a touchdown, while Jones caught nine passes for 94 yards and a touchdown. Goff finished the day 24-for-45 for 259 yards and a touchdown. His top target was Woods, who caught nine passes for 142 yards. Gurley was the game's top rusher with 101 yards on 14 carries, while also catching four passes for 10 yards.

Sunday, January 7, 2018

AFC: Jacksonville Jaguars 10, Buffalo Bills 3

This marked the Bills' first playoff appearance since 1999.

In the Jaguars' first playoff appearance since 2007 and the lowest scoring NFL postseason game since the 1997 season, Jacksonville's 15-play, 86-yard touchdown drive in the third quarter was enough to propel them to victory.

Every drive in the first quarter ended in a punt. Early in the second quarter, Jacksonville got a chance to score when Aaron Colvin intercepted a pass from Bills quarterback Tyrod Taylor on the Buffalo 35-yard line. However, the team lost three yards over the next three plays and decided to punt rather than risk a long field goal. From there, Buffalo took up nearly all the remaining time in the quarter, driving all the way to the Jaguars' 1-yard line. However, an offensive pass interference penalty against receiver Kelvin Benjamin pushed them back 10 yards and they ended up settling for a 31-yard Steven Hauschka field goal to take a 3–0 lead with 1:49 left in the half. After an exchange of punts, Jacksonville got the ball on their own 47-yard line with 40 seconds left and quarterback Blake Bortles scrambled twice for gains of 20 and 12 yards to set up Josh Lambo's 44-yard field goal, tying the score at halftime.

On the Jaguars' second possession of the second half, they drove 86 yards in 15 plays to take a 10–3 lead. The key player of the drive was running back Leonard Fournette, who carried the ball eight times for 33 yards and caught a pass for 12 yards. Eventually the team faced fourth-and-goal on the 1-yard line and decided to go for the touchdown; the decision paid off as Bortles threw a pass to tight end Ben Koyack for the score with 42 seconds left in the third quarter. Jacksonville's defense then locked the Bills down in the fourth quarter, forcing three punts and an interception by Jalen Ramsey on the Jaguars' 48-yard line with 26 seconds left.

Bortles completed only 12 of 23 passes for 87 yards and a touchdown, but was also the game's leading rusher with 88 yards on the ground. Bills running back LeSean McCoy rushed for 75 yards and caught six passes for 44 yards.

NFC: New Orleans Saints 31, Carolina Panthers 26

This was the first postseason meeting between the Panthers and Saints.

Carolina had a chance to score on their second possession of the game, driving to a third-and-goal on the Saints' 7-yard line. But over the next two plays, Kaelin Clay dropped a potential touchdown catch in the end zone and then Graham Gano missed a 25-yard field goal attempt. On the second play after the missed field goal, New Orleans quarterback Drew Brees threw a deep pass down the middle of the field to Ted Ginn Jr., who evaded a tackle attempt by James Bradberry and ran all the way to the end zone for an 80-yard touchdown reception. This gave New Orleans a 7–0 lead with less than two minutes left in the first quarter.

Carolina responded on their next drive, converting a 22-yard completion from Cam Newton to Greg Olsen and a 39-yard pass interference penalty against defensive back Ken Crawley into a 27-yard Gano field goal that cut the score to 7–3. However, New Orleans responded immediately, with Brees completing passes to Michael Thomas for gains of 19, 8 and 13 yards, as well as passes to running backs Mark Ingram II and Alvin Kamara for gains of 13 and 10 yards. On the last play of the drive, Brees put the Saints up 14–3 with a 9-yard touchdown pass to tight end Josh Hill. Carolina struck back, with Newton completing a 19-yard pass to Brenton Bersin and converting a fourth-and-1 with a quarterback sneak. Gano finished the 54-yard drive with a 39-yard field goal to make the score 14–6 with 2:47 left in the half. Brees responded by completing 4 of 6 passes for 67 yards on the way to a 1-yard touchdown run by fullback Zach Line, increasing the Saints' lead to 21–6. Taking the ball back with just over 40 seconds left, Newton completed a 24-yard pass to Devin Funchess. A few more plays moved the ball to the Saints' 40-yard line, where Gano barely managed to squeeze a 58-yard field goal inside the left upright, tying the NFL record for the longest field goal in postseason history.

The Panthers continued to chip away at their deficit with their first drive of the second half, as they moved the ball 64 yards in nine plays on a possession that featured a 29-yard run by Jonathan Stewart. Gano finished the drive with his fourth field goal, making the score 21–12. But New Orleans was able to respond, with Ginn catching two passes for 30 yards on a 36-yard drive that ended with Wil Lutz kicking a 57-yard field goal, bringing their lead back up to 24–12. With less than two minutes left in the third quarter, the Panthers started a 68-yard drive in which Olsen caught three passes for 54 total yards, the last one a 14-yard touchdown catch that cut the score to 24–19.

Following a few punts, Brees' 46-yard completion to Thomas gave the Saints a first down on the Carolina 5-yard line, where they went on to score with Kamara's 2-yard touchdown run and go up 31–19 with 5:08 left. On the third play of the Panthers' next drive, Newton completed a short pass to running back Christian McCaffrey, who raced 56 yards for a touchdown, cutting the score to 31–26. New Orleans took the ball back and drove to a fourth-and-2 situation on the 47-yard line at the two-minute warning. Deciding to go for the first down, Brees threw a pass that was intercepted by safety Mike Adams, giving the ball back to the Panthers, though Adams' decision to intercept the ball instead of knocking the pass down ended up costing his team 16 yards. Carolina then drove to the Saints' 21-yard line. On second down, Newton was flagged for intentional grounding while throwing a pass to avoid a sack, bringing up third-and-23. Then after an incompletion, safety Vonn Bell sacked Newton, forcing a turnover on downs with four seconds left.

Newton finished the game 24-of-40 for 349 yards and two touchdowns, along with 37 yards on the ground. His top target was Olsen (eight receptions for 107 yards and a touchdown), who was one of four players in this game to have over 100 receiving yards. The others were McCaffrey (six for 101 yards and a touchdown), Thomas (eight receptions for 131 yards) and Ginn (four receptions for 115 yards and a touchdown). Brees was 23-of-33 for 376 yards with two touchdowns and one interception. Bell had nine tackles – seven solo – and a sack.

Divisional playoffs

Saturday, January 13, 2018

NFC: Philadelphia Eagles 15, Atlanta Falcons 10

Philadelphia's defense recorded three sacks, held Atlanta to 281 yards – 83 below their season average – and stopped the Falcons on four consecutive plays after a first-and-goal on their own 9-yard line in the final minutes to preserve a 15–10 win.

The Eagles seemed primed to score on their opening drive when a 42-yard pass interference penalty on Falcons defensive back Brian Poole gave them the ball on the Falcons' 33-yard line. But on the next play, Ricardo Allen forced a fumble from Jay Ajayi that was recovered by safety Keanu Neal. Atlanta then drove 59 yards in 12 plays to score on Matt Bryant's 33-yard field goal, giving them a 3–0 lead. After the teams exchanged punts, Ajayi rushed four times for 26 yards and receiver Nelson Agholor ran for 21 yards on an end-around play as the team drove to a fourth-and-goal on the Atlanta 1-yard line. On the next play, LeGarrette Blount finished the 86-yard drive with a rush for the touchdown, putting the team up 6–3 with 10:28 left in the half after Jake Elliott hit the upright on his extra point attempt.

Atlanta had to punt on their next drive, but the ball bounced into Eagles blocker Bryan Braman and was recovered by Falcons linebacker LaRoy Reynolds on the Philadelphia 18-yard line, where they went on to go up 10–6 with Matt Ryan's six-yard touchdown pass to running back Devonta Freeman. Following a punt from each team, Philadelphia got the ball on their own 28-yard line with 46 seconds left in the half. Quarterback Nick Foles then completed passes to Corey Clement, Torrey Smith and Alshon Jeffery for gains of 7, 20 and 15 yards, setting up Elliott's 53-yard field goal, which cut the score to 10–9 at halftime.

With just under six minutes left in the third quarter, the Eagles got the ball on their own 7-yard line due to a 39-yard punt by Matt Bosher. From there, Foles completed 5 of 7 passes for 70 yards – Jeffery caught three of them for 46 – on a 74-yard, 12-play drive to take the lead at 12–10 with Elliott's 37-yard field goal. Elliott's ensuing kickoff went out of bounds, giving Atlanta good field position on their own 40-yard line. On the next play, the last of the third quarter, Ryan was sacked for a 10-yard loss by safety Rodney McLeod. The Falcons ended up going three-and-out and their defense was soon back on the field trying to contain another long Eagles drive. This one went for 14 plays and 80 yards, 32 of them on a reception by Ajayi, taking 7:57 off the clock. Desmond Trufant managed to end the drive on the Falcons' 3-yard line by tackling Clement a yard short of a first down on third-and-3. However, Elliott kicked his third field goal on the next play, giving Philadelphia a 15–10 lead with 6:02 remaining. Atlanta took the ball back and drove to a first down on the Eagles' 9-yard line, featuring a 20-yard reception by Julio Jones on fourth-and-6. After throwing incomplete passes on the next two plays, Ryan threw a seven-yard pass to Jones on the 2-yard line. Then with 1:05 left, Ryan tried to connect with Jones in the end zone, but the pass went just through his hands, enabling the Eagles to get the ball and run out the clock.

Filling in for injured starter Carson Wentz, Foles completed 23 of 30 passes for 246 yards. Ajayi rushed for 54 yards and caught three passes for 44 yards. Ryan completed 22 of 36 passes for 210 yards and a touchdown. Jones caught nine passes for 101 yards and rushed for 21 yards, while Tevin Coleman was the top rusher of the game with 10 carries for 79 yards, while also catching a pass for 14 yards.

With the win, the Eagles won their first playoff game and advanced to their first NFC Championship appearance since 2008, and their first at home since 2004.

AFC: New England Patriots 35, Tennessee Titans 14

New England racked up 438 yards of offense, 31 first downs and eight sacks as they advanced to their seventh consecutive AFC Championship game.

Midway through the first quarter, Tennessee drove 95 yards in 11 plays, featuring a 36-yard completion from Marcus Mariota to tight end Delanie Walker. Mariota finished the drive with a 15-yard touchdown pass to Corey Davis, who made a running one-handed catch in the back corner of the end zone to put the Titans up 7–0. However, the Patriots stormed right back, with Tom Brady completing five consecutive passes for 67 yards, the longest a 32-yard completion to Dion Lewis and the last a five-yard shovel pass to James White for a touchdown that tied the score. After a Tennessee punt, Brady completed three consecutive passes for 28 yards as the team drove 48 yards in six plays to go up 14–7 on White's six-yard touchdown run with 9:20 left in the half.

The next time New England got the ball, they had to punt after three plays, but a neutral zone infraction penalty on Titans defensive back Brynden Trawick gave them a first down. Taking advantage of their second chance, they ended up driving 91 yards in 16 plays to take a 21–7 lead on Brady's six-yard touchdown pass to Chris Hogan. Tennessee then drove to the Patriots' 46-yard line; on fourth-and-1, Derrick Henry tried to run for a first down, but defensive backs Malcolm Butler and Stephon Gilmore tackled him for no gain. With 17 seconds left, the Patriots were able to get to the Titans' 35-yard line with time remaining, but Stephen Gostkowski missed a 53-yard field goal attempt as time expired. In the first half alone, Brady completed 21 of 31 passes for 206 yards and two touchdowns.

In the third quarter, Brett Kern's 40-yard punt from his own 16-yard line gave the Patriots good field position on their 44-yard line. On the next play, Brady completed a 27-yard pass to tight end Rob Gronkowski and the team went on to increase their lead to 28–7 with Brandon Bolden's two-yard touchdown run. The next time New England got the ball, they went on a 15-play, 90-yard drive in which they only faced two third downs. Brady completed seven passes for 78 yards on the drive, the longest a 25-yard throw to Danny Amendola, and finished it off with a four-yard touchdown toss to Gronkowski, making the score 35–7 with 10:22 left. Before the end of the quarter, the Titans were able to make it 35–14 with Mariota's 11-yard touchdown pass to Davis on fourth down at the end of an 80-yard, 16-play drive.

At , Brady became the oldest quarterback to lead his team to victory in a postseason game, finishing the day 35-of-53 for 337 yards and three touchdowns. Amendola caught 11 passes for 112 yards, while also returning three punts for 18 yards. Lewis rushed for 62 yards, caught nine passes for 79 yards and returned a kickoff for 27 yards. Linebacker Geneo Grissom and defensive tackle Deatrich Wise Jr. each had two sacks for New England. Mariota completed 22 of 37 passes for 225 yards and two touchdowns.

This game set the NFL postseason record for the largest age difference between opposing quarterbacks: Brady was 40 and Mariota was 24.

Sunday, January 14, 2018

AFC: Jacksonville Jaguars 45, Pittsburgh Steelers 42

Jacksonville built up a 28–7 first-half lead and held off a second-half Steelers comeback to win the fourth-highest-scoring NFL playoff game. It was a rematch of a regular season game in Week 5, which the Jags won 30–9 thanks to their defense intercepting Steelers quarterback Ben Roethlisberger five times.

The Jaguars drove 66 yards in eight plays on their opening drive, with Blake Bortles completing passes to tight ends Ben Koyack and James O'Shaughnessy for gains of 21 and 19 yards on the way to a one-yard fourth-down touchdown run by Leonard Fournette. Later in the first quarter, linebacker Myles Jack intercepted a pass from Steelers quarterback Ben Roethlisberger on the Pittsburgh 18-yard line and Fournette increased Jacksonville's lead to 14–0 with a touchdown run on the next play. The Steelers responded with a drive to the Jacksonville 21-yard line, but on fourth-and-1, running back Le'Veon Bell was tackled by Jalen Ramsey and Malik Jackson for a four-yard loss. The Jaguars then drove 75 yards in 11 plays and scored on T. J. Yeldon's 4-yard touchdown run, increasing their lead to 21–0 with just over 11 minutes left in the half.

This time, the Steelers responded with a 64-yard scoring drive, featuring a 21-yard run by Bell and ending on Roethlisberger's 23-yard touchdown pass to Antonio Brown. But the next time Pittsburgh got the ball, Roethlisberger lost a fumble while being sacked by Yannick Ngakoue. Linebacker Telvin Smith recovered the ball and returned it 50 yards for a touchdown, making the score 28–7 with less than two minutes left until halftime. However, the Jaguars were penalized 15 yards for excessive celebration, before Cameron Sutton returned the ensuing kickoff 22 yards to the Jacksonville 49-yard line. Pittsburgh went on to drive 51 yards and cut their deficit to 28–14 on Roethlisberger's 36-yard touchdown completion to Martavis Bryant with 25 seconds remaining.

The Steelers drove 77 yards in 10 plays on their opening drive of the second half, cutting their deficit to 28–21 with Roethlisberger's 19-yard touchdown pass to Bell. Early in the final period, the Steelers got the ball on the Jaguars' 48-yard line due to a deflected punt, but ended up turning the ball over with an incomplete pass on fourth-and-1. On the ensuing Jacksonville drive, Bortles' 45-yard completion to Keelan Cole put them on the Steelers' 3-yard line and Fournette ran the ball in for a touchdown on the next play, giving the Jaguars a 35–21 lead. This was the start of a scoring run from both teams, cumulatively totaling 38 points in the fourth quarter. After Fournette's score, Roethlisberger started the next drive with a 21-yard completion to Brown and eventually ended it with a 43-yard touchdown pass to Brown that cut the score to 35–28. Jacksonville stormed right back, moving the ball 75 yards in eight plays, one of them a 40-yard completion from Bortles to Yeldon on third-and-5. Fullback Tommy Bohanon caught a 14-yard touchdown pass from Bortles with 4:19 left, giving the Jaguars a 42–28 lead. The Steelers responded by moving the ball 75 yards in 12 plays, the longest a 22-yard reception from Bell. Bell finished the drive with an eight-yard touchdown run, reducing his team's deficit to 42–35 with 2:19 to play. However, Pittsburgh failed to recover their ensuing onside kick attempt, resulting in Jacksonville getting the ball back on the Steelers' 36-yard line and leading to a 45-yard Josh Lambo field goal that put the Jaguars up 45–35. Pittsburgh then drove 75 yards in 10 plays, including a 42-yard completion from Roethlisberger to Brown. He ended up throwing a four-yard touchdown pass to JuJu Smith-Schuster, but by then, one second remained.

Bortles completed 14 of 26 passes for 214 yards and a touchdown. Fournette was the top rusher of the game with 25 carries for 109 yards and three touchdowns, along with two receptions for 10 yards. Setting several franchise playoff records, Roethlisberger completed 37 of 58 passes for 469 yards – the second highest total in NFL postseason history, behind Bernie Kosar's 489-yard tally, from January 1987 – with five touchdowns and an interception. Bell rushed for 67 yards and a touchdown, while also catching nine passes for 88 yards, while Brown caught seven passes for 132 yards and two touchdowns. Tight end Vance McDonald also went over 100 yards receiving, making 10 receptions for 112 yards. The Steelers lost despite gaining 545 yards of total offense, the most yards gained by a losing team in a playoff game (this record was later surpassed by the Patriots in Super Bowl LII). Ben Roethlisberger became the first NFL quarterback in a playoff game to throw for five touchdowns in a losing effort. He was the first NFL quarterback to do this in any game since Tony Romo in 2013 against the Denver Broncos. Following the game, the Steelers were criticized by their fans and the media for looking past the Jaguars to the Patriots in the AFC Championship Game, which, had the Steelers won, would have been the second consecutive AFC Championship meeting between the two teams. This was also the last game that running back Le'Veon Bell played for the Steelers, as he sat out the 2018 season due to a contract dispute, then sign with the New York Jets once he became a free agent at the start of 2019.

NFC: Minnesota Vikings 29, New Orleans Saints 24

Vikings quarterback Case Keenum's 61-yard touchdown pass to Stefon Diggs on the game's final play sent them to the NFC title game for the first time since the 2009 season and marked the first time in the NFL postseason that a game was won with a touchdown on the final play of regulation. The game has been referred to as the "Minneapolis Miracle".

Minnesota dominated the first half, building up a 17–0 lead. The Saints had to punt on their opening drive and Marcus Sherels returned the ball 19 yards to the Vikings' 45-yard line before being tackled by punter Thomas Morstead. The Vikings then drove 55 yards in eight plays, including a 22-yard catch by Jarius Wright on third-and-3, to score on Jerick McKinnon's 14-yard touchdown run. The next time they got the ball, two pass interference penalties on defensive back Ken Crawley gave the Vikings 54 yards on a 79-yard drive that ended with Kai Forbath's 20-yard field goal, increasing their lead to 10–0. Following two more possessions, Vikings safety Andrew Sendejo intercepted a pass from Drew Brees, giving Minnesota the ball on their own 42-yard line with 1:06 left in the first quarter. Keenum went 5-of-7 for 54 yards on a 58-yard drive that ended with Latavius Murray's one-yard touchdown run, giving the Vikings a 17–0 lead.

New Orleans responded with a drive to the Vikings' 14-yard line, but lost their chance to score when Brees threw a pass that was tipped at the line by Everson Griffen and intercepted by linebacker Anthony Barr. Then after a punt, Brees led the team to the Minnesota 30-yard line. But after two incompletions, Brees was sacked by safety Harrison Smith for a 10-yard loss and Wil Lutz missed a 58-yard field goal attempt with 26 seconds left in the half. The Vikings also got a field goal try before halftime, which resulted in Forbath missing from 49 yards out.

Minnesota took the opening kickoff and drove to the Saints' 30-yard line. However, in what turned out to be a crucial turning point, Keenum was sacked by Sheldon Rankins for a 10-yard loss on third down, pushing the team out of field goal range. New Orleans took the ball back and drove 80 yards in 12 plays, featuring a 23-yard reception by receiver Michael Thomas. Brees finished the drive with a 14-yard touchdown pass to Thomas, putting New Orleans on the board at 17–7. Then on the first play after the kickoff, Keenum threw a pass that was intercepted by rookie safety Marcus Williams, who returned it 12 yards to the Vikings' 30-yard line. New Orleans then drove for another touchdown, scoring on Brees' three-yard pass to Thomas that narrowed the gap to 17–14 with 13:09 left in the game.

Minnesota responded with a seven-play, 44-yard drive that included a 27-yard completion from Keenum to Wright and ended on Forbath's 49-yard field goal that increased the Vikings' lead to 20–14. Furthermore, Saints coach Sean Payton lost two timeouts on the drive as a result of failed replay challenges. After forcing the Saints to punt, the Vikings ran the clock under six minutes before having to kick the ball back to New Orleans. Saints lineman George Johnson blocked the punt, enabling his team to take over on the Vikings' 40-yard line. From there, Brees completed four consecutive passes, the last one a 14-yard touchdown completion to running back Alvin Kamara, giving them their first lead of the game at 21–20 with 3:01 left. Undaunted, the Vikings stormed back, mainly on the strength of a 24-yard Adam Thielen reception, moving the ball to the Saints 35-yard line, where Forbath made a 53-yard field goal that gave the team a 23–21 lead with 1:29 remaining. Brees was able to answer, throwing an 18-yard pass to tight end Josh Hill, an 11-yard pass to Ted Ginn Jr. and a 13-yard completion to Willie Snead on fourth-and-10. Minnesota eventually halted the drive on their own 25-yard line, where Lutz kicked a 43-yard field goal.

The Vikings were now down 24–23 with 25 seconds and one timeout left. After a touchback and a false start penalty put the ball on the 20-yard line, Keenum completed a 19-yard pass to Diggs on the 39-yard line, where the team promptly called their last timeout. Following two incomplete passes, they faced third-and-10 with 10 seconds left. On the next play, Keenum threw a deep pass near the right sideline to Diggs, who made a leaping catch near the Saints' 35-yard line. Williams was in front of Diggs when he made the catch, but while trying to make a tackle, he completely missed Diggs and instead collided with Crawley (his own teammate and the other defender in range), leaving the receiver with no one around him. Diggs nearly fell over at this point, but was able to stay on his feet by using his off-hand and stay in bounds as he ran all the way to the end zone for a 61-yard touchdown completion to give the Vikings a 29–24 win. After several minutes of pandemonium, the Vikings knelt on the extra point try to close out the victory.

Keenum completed 25 of 40 passes for 318 yards, a touchdown and an interception. Diggs was the game's leading receiver with six receptions for 137 yards and a touchdown. Like Keenum, Brees also finished the game 25-of-40, but for 294 yards, three touchdowns and two interceptions. Kamara rushed for 43 yards, while also catching six passes for 72 yards and a touchdown.

Conference Championships

Sunday, January 21, 2018

AFC: New England Patriots 24, Jacksonville Jaguars 20

This was the first conference championship game to feature a team from Florida in 15 years (the Super Bowl XXXVII champion Tampa Bay Buccaneers won the 2002 NFC championship Game). New England overcame a 10-point deficit in the fourth quarter to earn the franchise's 10th Super Bowl appearance.

On the opening drive of the game, Patriots quarterback Tom Brady completed a 31-yard pass to Brandin Cooks and a 20-yard pass to wide receiver Danny Amendola on fourth-and-1 as the team drove 62 yards in 10 plays to score on Stephen Gostkowski's 31-yard field goal. Following a pair of punts, Jacksonville quarterback Blake Bortles completed two passes to running back Corey Grant for 44 total yards as the team drove 76 yards in seven plays to take a 7–3 lead on a four-yard touchdown pass to tight end Marcedes Lewis on the second play of the second quarter. The next time they got the ball, Bortles completed all four pass attempts for 47 yards, one of them a 27-yard completion to Allen Hurns, as the team drove 77 yards in 10 plays to score on Leonard Fournette's four-yard touchdown run, increasing their lead to 14–3.

On the Jaguars' next drive, they moved the ball to a third-and-7 on the Patriots' 47-yard line. Bortles completed a 12-yard pass to Lewis that would have picked up a first down, but the team was flagged for a delay of game and Bortles was sacked by Adam Butler on the next play. New England got the ball on their own 15-yard line with 2:02 left in the half and proceeded to drive 85 yards in six plays – 47 yards from Jaguars penalties – to score on James White's 1-yard touchdown run, cutting the score to 14–10. However, Jacksonville safety Barry Church delivered a helmet-to-helmet hit on Patriots tight end Rob Gronkowski. Church drew a 15-yard penalty and Gronkowski was escorted off for medical testing that determined that he had suffered a concussion. Jacksonville got the ball back with 55 seconds and all three timeouts remaining, but chose to run out the clock and go to halftime, a choice that later earned them criticism, as no team had deliberately run the first half clock out with more than 50 seconds left during the season.

Jacksonville received the second half kickoff and drove 39 yards in nine plays, with 20 yards from a reception by fullback Tommy Bohanon. Josh Lambo finished the drive with a 54-yard field goal, increasing his team's lead to 17–10. Later in the period, the Jaguars advanced 66 yards in 11 plays, including 18 yards on a completion from Bortles to Marqise Lee on third-and-3. On the second play of the fourth quarter, Lambo scored with a 43-yard field goal, making the score 20–10. The game seemed to be slipping away from New England, particularly on their ensuing drive when linebacker Myles Jack forced and recovered a fumble from Dion Lewis on a trick play in which Amendola completed a forward pass to Lewis on the Jacksonville 33-yard line and Jack was ruled down by contact, nullifying what would have been a Jaguars touchdown. The New England defense subsequently forced a three-and-out. Taking the ball back on the Patriots' 15-yard line, Brady started the drive with an 18-yard pass to Cooks and then converted a third-and-18 with a 21-yard completion to Amendola on the 46-yard line. From there, Brady completed passes to Phillip Dorsett for 31 yards and Amendola for 14 yards before finishing the drive with a nine-yard touchdown pass to Amendola, making the score 20–17.

Following a pair of punts, Ryan Allen's 35-yard kick pinned the Jaguars back at their own 10-yard line. The Jaguars lost one yard over their next three plays, before Amendola returned Brad Nortman's 41-yard punt 20 yards to the Jacksonville 30-yard line with 4:58 left. From there, New England drove 30 yards in five plays, scoring on Brady's four-yard touchdown pass to Amendola to take a 24–20 lead with 2:48 left. After taking the ball back, Bortles' 29-yard completion to Dede Westbrook gave the Jaguars a first down on the Patriots' 38-yard line. But over the next two plays, Bortles threw an incompletion and then fumbled the ball while being sacked by linebacker Kyle Van Noy. Jacksonville tackle Cam Robinson recovered the fumble, but the team lost nine yards on the play, bringing up third-and-19. After a four-yard pass to James O'Shaughnessy, Bortles' next pass was swatted away by Stephon Gilmore, causing a turnover on downs with 1:47 left. New England got a key first down on third-and-10 with an 18-yard run by Lewis that let them run out the clock.

Brady completed 26 of 38 passes for 290 yards and two touchdowns, Cooks was the top receiver of the game with six receptions for 100 yards, while Amendola caught seven passes for 84 yards and two touchdowns; he also returned two punts for 24 yards. Van Noy had nine tackles – including five solo tackles – a sack and a forced fumble. Bortles completed 23 of 36 passes for 293 yards and a touchdown, while Fournette was the leading rusher of the game with 76 yards and a touchdown and Hurns was the Jaguars' leading receiver with six receptions for 80 yards.

NFC: Philadelphia Eagles 38, Minnesota Vikings 7

This was the first time a Super Bowl host team had appeared in the conference championship. Although the Vikings scored with their opening drive, they were soon buried by Philadelphia, who racked up 456 total yards and 38 unanswered points. Meanwhile, the Vikings' eight remaining drives after their game-opening touchdown resulted in three punts, two interceptions, two turnovers on downs and one lost fumble.

Minnesota drove 75 yards in nine plays on their first possession, taking a 7–0 lead with Case Keenum's 25-yard touchdown pass to tight end Kyle Rudolph. The Eagles had to punt on their next drive, but after moving the ball to the 43-yard line, Keenum threw a pass that was intercepted by cornerback Patrick Robinson and returned 50 yards for a touchdown. Following a Vikings punt, Philadelphia drove 75 yards in 12 plays to take a 14–7 lead. Jay Ajayi started the drive with two carries for 20 yards, while Nick Foles converted a third-and-10 with an 11-yard completion to Zach Ertz and LeGarrette Blount finished the drive with an 11-yard rushing score on the third play of the second quarter. Later on, the Vikings drove to a third-and-5 on the Eagles' 16-yard line. But on the next play, Derek Barnett forced a fumble while sacking Keenum and defensive end Chris Long recovered the ball. Philadelphia then drove 76 yards in six plays, scoring on Foles' 53-yard touchdown pass to Alshon Jeffery to go up 21–7 with 3:16 left in the half. Following a punt, the Eagles got the ball on their 20-yard line with 29 seconds on the clock. Foles started the drive with an 11-yard pass to Ajayi, who managed to get out of bounds, before throwing a 36-yard completion on Ertz on the Vikings' 33-yard line. On the next play, Foles' 13-yard completion to Ajayi moved the ball to the 20 yard line with four seconds left, where Jake Elliott kicked a 38-yard field goal, making the score 24–7 at halftime.

The Eagles increased their lead to 31–7 less than five minutes into the second half, scoring with Foles' 41-yard touchdown pass to Torrey Smith on a flea-flicker play. The Vikings responded with a drive to a first-and-goal on the Eagles' seven-yard line. After three incomplete passes, Keenum threw a pass to Adam Thielen that was initially ruled a touchdown, but overturned to an incomplete pass after replays showed the ball had hit the ground, causing a turnover on downs. The Eagles took over and drove 92 yards in 12 plays, including a 42-yard completion from Foles to Nelson Agholor on third-and-5. Foles finished the drive with a five-yard touchdown pass to Jeffery on the second play of the fourth quarter, making the score 38–7. The Vikings had only two drives on the final period, one of them ending with a turnover on downs and another with an interception by Eagles defensive back Corey Graham.

Foles completed 26 of 33 passes for 352 yards and three touchdowns, Ertz was the leading receiver of the game with eight receptions for 93 yards, while Jeffery caught five passes for 85 yards and two touchdowns. Ajayi rushed for 73 yards and caught three passes for 26 yards. Keenum finished the game 28-of-48 for 271 yards and a touchdown, with two interceptions, while Jerick McKinnon was the Vikings' leading rusher with 40 yards and their leading receiver with 11 receptions for 86 yards.

This was the final game of referee Ed Hochuli's 28-year career.

In the days leading up to the game, Vikings fans were seen performing the "Skol!" chant around various Philadelphia landmarks, such as the steps of the Philadelphia Museum of Art, where they also defaced the statue of Rocky with Vikings colors. As a result of the lopsided victory, the game soon became part of Philadelphia sports lore, called the "Minneapolis Massacre", a reference to the prior week's Minneapolis Miracle.

Super Bowl LII: Philadelphia Eagles 41, New England Patriots 33

Television coverage
All playoff games were broadcast nationally on network television.

ABC and ESPN simulcast one AFC wild card game, while CBS broadcast all the other AFC playoff games. Coverage of the NFC Wild Card and Divisional rounds was split between Fox and NBC, with each network having coverage of one game in each of those two rounds. CBS had exclusive coverage of the AFC Championship Game. Fox had exclusive coverage of the NFC Championship Game. NBC had exclusive coverage of Super Bowl LII.

Playoff games TV ratings

References

Playoffs
National Football League playoffs